Fanni Luukkonen (13 March 1882 – 27 October 1947) was the longtime leader of the Finnish Lotta Svärd, a voluntary auxiliary organisation for women.

Fanni Luukkonen was born in Oulu. She was chosen as the leader of Lotta Svärd in 1929. During her time the organisation grew to 232,000 members, the largest women's organisation in Finland, and even in the world. She was awarded the Order of the Cross of Liberty 1st Class with swords, by Marshal Mannerheim in June 1940. She was the first woman to receive this decoration.

She was also awarded the Order of the German Eagle with Star in 1943. She was the only non-German woman to receive the medal.

When the Continuation War ended, the Soviet Union demanded that Lotta Svärd, along with the Suojeluskunta, were to be disbanded.

In the Suuret Suomalaiset (Greatest Finns) competition (similar to the 100 Greatest Britons) Fanni Luukkonen was voted for 44th place.

Luukkonen died in Helsinki, aged 65.

References

1882 births
1947 deaths
People from Oulu
People from Oulu Province (Grand Duchy of Finland)
Finnish women in World War I
Recipients of the Order of the Cross of Liberty, 1st Class